The Nabob Affair (French: Au voleur!, German: Affäre Nabob) is a 1960 French-West German comedy film directed by Ralph Habib and starring Paul Guers, Perrette Pradier and O.E. Hasse.

Cast
 Paul Guers as Serge  
 Perrette Pradier as Amenita  
 O.E. Hasse as Le Nabab  
 Sonja Ziemann as La milliardaire  
 Mary Marquet as L'hôtelière 
 Georges Alban as Commissar  
 Gérard Darrieu 
 Jean-Pierre Lorrain 
 Jean-Pierre Zola as Hotel director

References

Bibliography 
 Philippe Rège. Encyclopedia of French Film Directors, Volume 1. Scarecrow Press, 2009.

External links 
 

1960 films
1960s crime comedy films
West German films
1960s French-language films
Films directed by Ralph Habib
French crime comedy films
German crime comedy films
Films about con artists
1960 comedy films
1960s French films
1960s German films
French-language German films